The Iranian Navy's Factories is the shipyard of the Islamic Republic of Iran Navy located in Bandar Abbas, Hormozgan Province.

Products 
As of 2018, the shipyard has completed two s. There is also a Sina-class fast attack craft under construction.
  frigate
  frigate
  (under construction)
  (under construction)

See also 
 Marine Industries Organization

References

Shipbuilding companies of Iran
Bandar Abbas
Islamic Republic of Iran Navy
Defence companies of Iran